The Academic Female Voice Choir Lyran, also referred to as simply , is a Finland-Swedish academic female voice choir in Helsinki, Finland. It is the only women's choir affiliated with the University of Helsinki.

History
The choir was established in 1946 by a group of female students in Helsinki, led by Eja Tollet , who became the first artistic director of the choir. The choir was known as  until 1948.

Present artistic director Jutta Seppinen, MMus, began her tenure in the autumn term of 2009.

Ever since 1954, the choir has collaborated extensively with the Academic Male Voice Choir of Helsinki, the sole other Swedish-language University of Helsinki choir. The two choirs give several annually recurring concerts together.

Lyran has since 1968 kept a close relation to the Norwegian male choir Trondhjems Studentersangforening.

Discography

Notes

Citations

References

Further reading

External links

 Official website
 University of Helsinki
 Student Union of the University of Helsinki

University choirs
Women's choirs
Finnish choirs
Musical groups established in 1946
1946 establishments in Finland
Finland Swedish